Caminando may refer to:

Books
Caminando, autobiography of Marta Sahagún 2005

Music

Albums
Caminando (album), album by Rubén Blades and Son del Solar 1991
Caminando, album by Trigo Limpio 1980
Caminando, album by Tony Tun Tun 1999
Caminando, album by Millo Torres y el Tercer Planeta 1999
Caminando, album by Bobby Cruz 2002
Caminando, album by Sur Caribe and Ricardo Leyva 2005
Caminando, album by David Liebman and Jean-Marie Machado 2009
Caminando 2001-2006, Chambao 2007
Sigue Caminando, album by Lolita (Spanish singer) 2007
Sigue Caminando, album by Olga Román

Songs
Caminando (Rubén Blades song), composed Blades 1991
Caminando (Amaia Montero song) 2010
"Caminando", song by flamenco singer Camarón,  El Camarón de la Isla composed by Antonio Humanes, with Paco de Lucía from Calle Real (album) 1983
"Caminando" by Eddie Palmieri composed by Charlie Palmieri from The Best of Eddie Palmieri: Lo Mejor de Eddie Palmieri
"Caminando" by Ron Carter composed by Ron Carter from When Skies Are Grey 2001
"Caminando" by Ray Barretto and Celia Cruz from Tremendo Trio: Celia, Ray, Adalberto
"Caminando" by Lolita (Spanish singer) composed by Roberto Poveda from Sigue Caminando 2007
"Caminando" by Bobby Cruz composed by Bobby Cruz from album of the same name
"Caminando" by Ana Belén from Ana en Río and other albums
"Caminando" by Joe Cuba composed by D.R.S. from Red, Hot and Cha Cha Cha 1965
"Caminando" by Melina León composed by Donato Póveda / Melina León from the album Dos Caras
"Caminando" by Dúo Dinámico from Hoy Como Ayer
"Caminando" by Patrick Sébastien from Ça va être ta fête!